Answer is the fifth and final non-compilation album by the Japanese indie rock band Supercar. It was released on February 25, 2004 and peaked at #18 on the Oricon Albums Chart.

Track listing

References

2004 albums
Supercar (band) albums
Ki/oon Records albums